Koshkuiyeh Rural District is a rural district (dehestan) in Koshkuiyeh District, Rafsanjan County, Kerman Province, Iran. At the 2006 census, its population was 5,995, in 1,438 families. The rural district has 46 villages.

References 

Rural Districts of Kerman Province
Rafsanjan County